Podotheca chrysantha is a small herb in the family Asteraceae endemic to Western Australia.  It grows from 0.2 to 0.5 m high, and has yellow flowers which are seen from August to December. It grows in sand over limestone or laterite on  limestone ridges and in wet depressions.

Taxonomy
It was first described in 1845 by Joachim Steetz as Ixiolaena chrysantha. In 1867 it was assigned to the genus Podotheca by George Bentham.

References

External links
 Podotheca chrysantha Occurrence data from the Australasian Virtual Herbarium

chrysantha
Taxa named by George Bentham
Flora of Western Australia
Plants described in 1867